Lophoglossus is a genus of beetles in the family Carabidae, containing the following species:

 Lophoglossus gravis LeConte, 1873
 Lophoglossus haldemanni (LeConte, 1848)
 Lophoglossus scrutator (LeConte, 1848)
 Lophoglossus substrenuus (Csiki, 1930)
 Lophoglossus tartaricus (Say, 1823)
 Lophoglossus vernix Casey, 1913

References

Pterostichinae